Spranger is a name which may refer to:

Bartholomeus Spranger (or Bartholomaeus) (1546–1611), a Flemish Mannerist painter and etcher
Carl-Dieter Spranger (born 1939), a German politician
Eduard Spranger (1882–1963), a German philosopher and psychologist 
John William Spranger (died 1822), a Royal Navy officer 
Lothar Spranger, a East German footballer 
Spranger Barry (1719–1777), an Irish actor